Boljanići is a small village in the municipality of Pljevlja, Montenegro. It was historically known as Bolehnići.

Demographics
According to the 2003 census, the village had a population of 60 people, 48,33% declaring as Serbs and 46,66% as Montenegrins.

According to the 2011 census, its population was 62.

References

Populated places in Pljevlja Municipality